Samuel Felix Hindsman Jr. (October 31, 1917 – June 16, 1997) was an American football, basketball, and baseball coach. He was a standout athlete at West Tennessee State Teachers College—now known as the University of Memphis—from 1939 to 1941. After coaching at a pair of Arkansas high schools, Hindsman served as the head basketball coach at the University of Central Arkansas in Conway, Arkansas from 1944 to 1945 and again from 1946 to 1947. He moved to Russellville, Arkansas, where he served as the head basketball coach at Arkansas Tech University from 1947 to 1966. Hindsman also served as the head baseball coach (1953 to 1956) and head football coach (1954 to 1958) at Arkansas Tech.

References

External links
 

1917 births
1997 deaths
American men's basketball players
Arkansas Tech Wonder Boys baseball coaches
Arkansas Tech Wonder Boys basketball coaches
Arkansas Tech Wonder Boys football coaches
Central Arkansas Bears basketball coaches
Central Arkansas Bears football coaches
Memphis Tigers football players
Memphis Tigers men's basketball players
High school football coaches in Arkansas
People from Itta Bena, Mississippi
Players of American football from Mississippi
Basketball coaches from Mississippi
Basketball players from Mississippi